Sport Vereniging Zwaluwen Wierden is a football club from Wierden, Netherlands.

Founded on 23 September 1948, the club competes in the Hoofdklasse.

External links
Official website 

Football clubs in the Netherlands
Association football clubs established in 1948
1948 establishments in the Netherlands
Football clubs in Overijssel
Sport in Wierden